Žilvinas Tratas, also known as James Tratas (born 10 December 1988) is a Lithuanian actor, screenwriter and TV personality.

Biography 
James Tratas was born in Vilnius, Lithuania. His father Jurijus is a carpenter and his mother Vitalija plays flute in the Lithuanian National Military Band. From an early age his parents tried to direct him towards the arts. He attended Secondary School of Tuskulėnai, which has enchanted fine arts module and Musical School of Balys Dvarionas. In early teens Tratas rebelled against this decision and exchanged musical school for boxing.

From 2009 to 2014 he studied at Lithuanian Academy of Music and Theatre where he obtained the bachelor's degree in acting. He started to work actively in film, TV and theatre in his first year of studies and gained national recognition before receiving a diploma. His first national break was after portraying a ruthless villain in a cult Lithuanian TV series Nemylimi Svetimi Pasmerkti.

Soon after obtaining diploma in 2014, he left Lithuania to pursue an international acting career. Since then he worked in films with oscar winning directors (Nikita Mikhalkov, Gabrielle Salvatores) in different countries such as United Kingdom, Russia, Czech Republic.

Filmography

References

External links 
 

1988 births
Living people
Lithuanian male film actors
Lithuanian male television actors
Lithuanian male stage actors
Lithuanian emigrants to the United Kingdom
Lithuanian emigrants to Russia
Lithuanian emigrants to the Czech Republic
Lithuanian expatriates in the United Kingdom
Lithuanian expatriates in Russia
Lithuanian expatriates in the Czech Republic